Three bobsleigh events were competed at the 2002 Winter Olympics, at Utah Olympic Park.  The competition took place between February 16 and February 23, 2002.

For the first time since 1932, Olympic bobsleigh added a new event, with the first ever women's competition, won by Jill Bakken and  Vonetta Flowers of the United States.

The competitions comprised four heats.  Teams raced in the first and third heats in the order of the draw.  The second heat was raced in order of ranking after the first heat, and the fourth heat is raced in order of the ranking after the first three heats.  Total time for the four heats determined the final rank.

Medal summary

Medal table

Events

Participating NOCs
Thirty-four nations competed in the bobsleigh events at Salt Lake City.

References

 
2002 Winter Olympics
2002 Winter Olympics events
Olympics
Bobsleigh in the United States